Douglas Francisco Martínez Juárez (born 5 June 1997) is a Honduran professional footballer who plays as a striker for USL Championship club Indy Eleven and the Honduras national team.

Career

Early career
Born in Olanchito, Honduras, Martínez began his career in the youth ranks of Vida.

Vida
On 7 September 2013, Martínez made his professional debut for Vida at the age of 16 in a Liga Nacional match against Real Sociedad. The match ended in a 2–2 draw. He scored his first professional goal on 31 July 2016, in a 1–1 draw with Real Sociedad at the Estadio Francisco Martínez Durón.

On 5 October 2016, it was confirmed that he would go on trial period for 10 days with United Soccer League side New York Red Bulls II. After his trial with the New York side, Martínez returned to Vida and featured 13 times during the 2016–17 season, starting in nine games and scoring one goal.

New York Red Bulls II
Having impressed the club during his trial in 2016, New York Red Bulls II announced the loan signing of Martínez on 26 April 2017. On 6 May 2017, Martínez made his debut, scoring his side's final goal in a 3–1 victory over Harrisburg City Islanders.

Real Monarchs
On 23 January 2019, Martínez returned to the United States, permanently joining USL Championship side Real Monarchs. He made his debut in a 1–1 draw with Sacramento Republic FC. Martínez would go on to score 17 goals in 25 appearances for Real Monarchs, as his side won the USL Championship.

Real Salt Lake
After impressing with Real Monarchs, Martínez moved to their MLS parent club Real Salt Lake in August 2019. He made his debut the following 11 September as a starter in a 1–0 home win over San Jose Earthquakes. He was replaced in the second-half by Jefferson Savarino. He scored his first goal on 27 July 2020 in the 5–2 round of 16 defeat to San Jose Earthquakes in the MLS is Back Tournament. He scored his first league goal in MLS on 14 October in the 2–1 home win against Portland Timbers. After having made only six appearances with no goals in the 2021 season, Martínez was demoted to the reserves once again. He made his second debut for Real Monarchs on 9 June 2021 in a 2–0 home win against Sacramento Republic FC. He scored the following 26 June in a 1–1 draw with San Antonio FC.

On 23 August 2021, Martínez joined USL Championship side San Diego Loyal SC on loan until the end of the 2021 season. He made his debut in the 4–2 home win against LA Galaxy II. His first goal came on 9 October in a 2–1 home win against Sacramento Republic FC, after he came on as a substitute for Callum Montgomery.

Following the 2021 season, Martínez's contract option was declined by Real Salt Lake.

Sacramento Republic
Martínez signed with USL Championship side Sacramento Republic on 27 January 2022 ahead of their 2022 season.

International
Martínez has featured regularly for his country's U-20 team, playing at 2017 CONCACAF U-20 Championship, starting five of the team's six matches notching one goal as Honduras qualified for the 2017 FIFA U-20 World Cup in South Korea with their second-place finish. He represented Honduras at the 2019 Pan American Games football tournament in Peru and scored twice in the competition winning silver with his country. Martínez was called up to the senior team for CONCACAF Nations League fixtures on 10 and 13 October. He scored on his debut against Trinidad and Tobago in a 2–0 win away in Trinidad.

International goals
Scores and results list Honduras' goal tally first.

Honours
Real Monarchs
USL Cup: 2019

Honduras U23
Pan American Silver Medal: 2019

References

External links
 
 

Living people
1997 births
Honduran footballers
Honduras international footballers
Honduran expatriate footballers
Honduran expatriate sportspeople in the United States
Expatriate soccer players in the United States
Association football forwards
C.D.S. Vida players
New York Red Bulls II players
Real Monarchs players
Real Salt Lake players
San Diego Loyal SC players
Sacramento Republic FC players
Indy Eleven players
USL Championship players
Major League Soccer players
Competitors at the 2018 Central American and Caribbean Games
Central American and Caribbean Games bronze medalists for Honduras
Central American Games gold medalists for Honduras
Central American Games medalists in football
People from Yoro Department
Pan American Games medalists in football
Pan American Games silver medalists for Honduras
Footballers at the 2019 Pan American Games
Central American and Caribbean Games medalists in football
Honduras under-20 international footballers
Medalists at the 2019 Pan American Games
Footballers at the 2020 Summer Olympics
Olympic footballers of Honduras